Ballinlea Upper is a townland in County Antrim, Northern Ireland, near to Straid. It is situated in the historic barony of Cary and the civil parish of Ballintoy and covers an area of 280 acres

The name derives from the Irish: Baile an Leagha (town of the physician).

The population of the townland decreased during the 19th century:

See also 
List of townlands in County Antrim

References

Townlands of County Antrim
Civil parish of Ballintoy